Almen Abdi (born 21 October 1986) is a retired Swiss footballer who played as an attacking midfielder. He has previously played for Zürich, Le Mans, Udinese, Watford and Sheffield Wednesday. He has also been capped by the Switzerland national team.

Career

Zürich

Abdi started his football career at Zürich, where he joined the youth academy in 1993 and came through the ranks. He made his professional debut at age seventeen in the 2003–04 season, coming on as a substitute for Arthur Petrosyan in the 89th minute, in a 2–1 loss against Basel. Throughout his first three seasons at Zürich, Abdi featured little, and mostly remained a bench player. However, the 2006–07 season was Abdi's breakthrough season, making more appearances than ever and establishing himself as a first team starter. During the 2006–07 season, Abdi would make his Champions League debut in the second qualification round against Austrian side Red Bull Salzburg, after coming on as a substitute. He scored his first league goal on 29 July 2006, in a 2–0 win over Schaffhausen.

Abdi was part of the 2005–06, 2006–07 and 2008–09 Swiss Championship winning Zürich squad. He was awarded an improved contract in June 2006 which would last until the summer of 2010. Having finished as the club's top goalscorer in the 2008–09 league campaign with 19 goals and adding an impressive 12 assists, Abdi was not only named the best midfielder in the Swiss Super League, but also presented with the season's Best Swiss Player Award. In the 2009–10 season, Abdi was dropped to the FC Zürich reserve team in November 2009, alongside teammate Andrés Vasquez, with FC Zürich stating they were planning for the future without the duo.

Le Mans
In January 2010, Abdi was transferred to Le Mans on a six-month contract with the option to extend it at a later date, should the club remain in Ligue 1. However, Le Mans failed to avoid relegation to Ligue 2 at the end of the campaign, with Abdi making a total of 13 appearances.

Udinese
In April 2010, Abdi confirmed that he would be joining Udinese in the summer once he became a free agent. In Udine, he made 19 appearances during the 2010–11 season, most of them coming from the bench. The following campaign saw Abdi score his first goal for the Friulian club in the Europa League on 29 September 2011, converting the penalty to equalise against Celtic at Celtic Park. Shortly after, there was a rumour of Abdi making a return to Zürich. But Abdi denied any rumour of him being linked to Zürich, insisting he felt fine and settled at Udinese.

Watford
In July 2012, Abdi trained with Watford with a view to a possible loan. He featured in the Championship side's first three pre-season friendlies, and later joined the club on a season-long loan for the 2012–13. Abdi scored his first goal for Watford on his league debut against Crystal Palace on 18 August 2012. In November 2012, Abdi soon injured his shoulder, dislocating it in the process. Following four weeks of regeneration, he returned to the bench and came on as a substitute during the 2–1 home loss against Hull City on 8 December 2012. Abdi made it three league goals in as many games with his effort against Birmingham City on 16 February 2013, taking his total goal tally to 9. Abdi had netted in the previous two games against Bolton Wanderers and Crystal Palace. Abdi then scored his 10th goal of the season with a sumptuous free kick in a 1–1 draw with Wolverhampton Wanderers on 1 March 2013. Towards the end of the season, Abdi reportedly stated his desire to remain at Watford on a permanent basis, having become the club's fan favorite. In early May 2013, he picked up the Hornets' Player of the Season award.

On 19 July 2013, Watford confirmed that Abdi had signed a three-year deal on a permanent basis. In August 2013, he developed a severe case of plantar fasciitis (a foot disease), which kept him out of action for several months. Abdi made his long-awaited comeback as a 75th-minute substitute in a 2–0 FA Cup third round replay victory over Bristol City on 14 January 2014. Abdi then made his league return four days later, as a first-half substitute against AFC Bournemouth on 18 January 2014, coming on for the injured Iriney.

Making his first league start for seven months, Abdi scored for Watford in a 3–0 home win over Leeds United on 8 April 2014.

On 30 August 2014, Abdi scored his first ever brace for the club at Vicarage Road as Watford beat Huddersfield Town 4–2, with Abdi providing the goals to make it 2–1 and 4–2 respectively as well as registering an assist in the same game.

Sheffield Wednesday
On 28 July 2016, Abdi joined Championship side Sheffield Wednesday for an undisclosed fee.

He was released by Sheffield Wednesday at the end of the 2018–19 season.

International career
He made his senior Switzerland international debut against Cyprus on 20 August 2008.

Personal life
On 24 April 2011, Abdi was targeted by burglars and his possessions were stolen. He is good friends with compatriot and ex-Udinese teammate Gökhan Inler.

Career statistics

Honours
FC Zürich
Swiss Cup: 2004–05
Super League/Nationalliga A: 2005–06, 2006–07, 2008–09

References

External links

FC Zurich Stats

Living people
1986 births
Sportspeople from Prizren
Association football midfielders
Swiss men's footballers
Switzerland international footballers
Switzerland under-21 international footballers
Kosovan footballers
FC Zürich players
Le Mans FC players
Udinese Calcio players
Watford F.C. players
Sheffield Wednesday F.C. players
Serie A players
Ligue 1 players
English Football League players
Premier League players
Swiss Super League players
Swiss expatriate footballers
Swiss expatriate sportspeople in Italy
Expatriate footballers in France
Expatriate footballers in Italy
Expatriate footballers in England
Swiss expatriate sportspeople in England
Kosovan emigrants to Switzerland
Swiss people of Albanian descent
Swiss people of Bosnia and Herzegovina descent
Swiss expatriate sportspeople in France